Faccani is an Italian surname. Notable people with the surname include:

Clemente Faccani (1920–2011), Italian bishop and Vatican diplomat 
Roberta Faccani (born 1968), Italian singer and actress

See also
Faccini

Italian-language surnames